If Looks Could Kill (released in the United Kingdom as Teen Agent) is a 1991 American action comedy film directed by William Dear and starring Richard Grieco.

Plot
Eighteen-year-old Michael Corben (Richard Grieco) of Detroit, Michigan, is a handsome underachiever slacker. Rather than attending his high school French class, he spends all of his time drinking and partying, until graduation arrives, when all of his debauchery catches up to him and he learns that he cannot graduate without a French credit. He has only one more chance to obtain the credit: the French teacher, Mrs. Grober (Robin Bartlett), and the French Club are headed to France for summer school, and Michael must accompany them and participate if he wants to graduate that year.

However, at the airport, a CIA agent also named Michael Corben (David McIlwraith), who is on his way to France as well, is killed by the assassin Ilsa Grunt (Linda Hunt), henchwoman and surrogate mother of the villainous Augustus Steranko (Roger Rees) who seeks to steal all of the gold in Europe and use it to mint his own coins under the guise of a common currency. Because important details about the agent's identity (including his actual age) have been kept meticulously secret, Michael is mistaken for the CIA agent. He is inexplicably boarded first class on his flight to Paris, and upon arrival is whisked away by British Intelligence.

The late Agent Corben's mission had been to protect Augustus Steranko, who (being not suspected to be evil) has been murdering European finance ministers as part of his plan. After some efforts to explain that he is not the Corben they think he is, Michael agrees to play along once it becomes apparent that he will be allowed to utilize high-tech gadgets, including X-ray glasses, exploding chewing gum and LA Gear sneakers with suction cups, as well as a Lotus Esprit. At first, he enjoys the perks of being a spy, but begins to rethink his decision once his life gets endangered by Steranko's deadly assassins, including Zigesfeld (Tom Rack), a henchman with a prosthetic gold hand, and Areola Canasta (Carole Davis), who kills her victims using her poisonous pet scorpion.

In the meantime, Steranko captures Michael's teacher and classmates and holds them all hostage at his remote castle stronghold. Michael teams up with a girl his own age named Mariska (Gabrielle Anwar), the daughter of Agent Blade (Roger Daltrey) who was murdered by Steranko and his gang, to bring the villains down and save his friends as well as all of Europe's gold. Despite being briefly captured and imprisoned by Steranko's men, Michael escapes, rescues Mrs. Grober and his friends, and battles and defeats Zigesfeld.

Steranko, his duplicitous nature exposed by Michael, kidnaps Mariska and attempts to escape with his gold in his Eurocopter Ecureuil helicopter. Michael manages to rescue Mariska, and Steranko is subsequently killed when he falls out of the helicopter, and it and the onboard gold supply both drop on him. Afterwards, Mrs. Grober agrees to give Michael the French credit that he needs.

Cast
 Richard Grieco as Michael Corben
 Linda Hunt as Ilsa Grunt
 Roger Rees as Augustus Steranko, a leader of European Economic Community.
 Robin Bartlett as Patricia Grober
 Gabrielle Anwar as Mariska Blade
 Geraldine James as Vendetta Galante
 Michael Siberry as Derek Richardson
 Tom Rack as Zigesfeld
 Carole Davis as Areola Canasta
 Frederick Coffin as Lieutenant Colonel Larabee
 Roger Daltrey as Blade
 Oliver Dear as Kent
 Cynthia Preston as Melissa Tyler
 Michael Sinelnikoff as Haywood
 Travis Swords as Kelly
 Gerry Mendicino as Herb Corben
 Fiona Reid as Marge Corben
 Michael Vinokur as Brad Corben
 David McIlwraith as Agent Michael Corben
 Gene Mack as Agent Kramer
 Jacques Tourangeau as Jacques Lefevre

Production
Originally written by Fred Dekker as an original script, titled Teen Agent, which was to blend  Anthony Michael Hall from John Hughes’ films with a James Bond adventure.

Soundtrack

"If Looks Could Kill (No Turning Back)" - Glenn Medeiros
"One Hot Country" - The Outfield
"Loud Guitars, Fast Cars and Wild, Wild Livin'" - Contraband
"One Mo' Time" - Trixter
"Better the Devil You Know" - Kylie Minogue
"Teach Me How to Dream" - Robin McAuley
"All Is Fair" - The Fixx
"Maybe This Time" - The Stabilizers
"My Saltine" - Bang Tango
"Michael Corben's Adventure" - David Foster and Bill Ross

Box office and reception
If Looks Could Kill opened in 11th place for $2.2 million in the US.  It grossed $7.8 million at the end of its US theatrical run. Roger Ebert of Chicago Sun-Times gave the film 3 out of 4 stars, saying that he initially thought it a bad film.  Eventually, he decided the film's over-the-top goofiness was intentional and saw it as a subversion of the spy film formula rather than an incompetent ripoff.  Varietys review wrote that it "spoofs the James Bond formula in tiresome fashion".  Rita Kempley of The Washington Post called it "insipid, tiresome and full of gross kids".  She also criticized the violence, which she said was disturbing in a film marketed to the youth demographic. On Rotten Tomatoes, the film has a 29% approval rating and a 3.5/10 average score based on seven reviews.

Awards and nominations

References

External links
 
 
 
 

1991 films
1991 action comedy films
American action comedy films
American spy comedy films
Films directed by William Dear
Films scored by David Foster
Films set in Detroit
Films set in Paris
Films shot in Paris
Films shot in Montreal
1990s spy comedy films
Warner Bros. films
Parody films based on James Bond films
1990s English-language films
1990s American films